Washington Jones (July 14, 1925 – November 9, 1987) was an American boxer. He competed in the men's middleweight event at the 1948 Summer Olympics. At the 1948 Summer Olympics, he lost to Auguste Cavignac of Belgium.

References

External links
 

1925 births
1987 deaths
American male boxers
Olympic boxers of the United States
Boxers at the 1948 Summer Olympics
Boxers from St. Louis
Middleweight boxers